Viikkosanomat was an illustrated weekly news magazine in Finland which was published between 1922 and 1975. During its lifetime it was one of the most read magazines in the country.

History and profile
The magazine was started in 1922 under the title Viikko-Sanomat as the official media outlet of the Economic Enlightenment Center and was distributed to the trailers who were members of the organization. It was acquired by the Finnish media company Sanoma in 1930 and was renamed as Viikkosanomat. The magazine was published on a weekly basis. It contained articles and travel stories which were accompanied by photographs. One of its editors-in-chief was Aatos Erkko who served in the post in the 1950s. The magazine was among the pro-Western and anti-communist periodicals in Finland. It was the only Finnish publication which uncovered the killing of Hungarians during the Hungarian Uprising in 1956.

Viikkosanomat folded in 1975.

References

External links
 

1922 establishments in Finland
1975 disestablishments in Finland
Defunct magazines published in Finland
Finnish-language magazines
News magazines published in Europe
Magazines established in 1922
Magazines disestablished in 1975
Magazines published in Helsinki
Weekly magazines published in Finland